Boris Korneev may refer to:
 Boris Korneev (painter) (1922–1973), Soviet Russian painter and art teacher
 Boris Korneev (serial killer) (1929/30–1968), Soviet serial killer